Lieutenant-Colonel Robert Henry Thomas Torrens  (1780 – May 1840) was a British Army officer. He served with distinction at the Battle of Waterloo receiving the Companion of the Order of the Bath and the Second Class of the Order of St Anne for valor and distinguished service. Robert Torrens was Commissioner on behalf of the British Army at the Convention of Saint-Cloud (July 1815). He wrote a detailed account of the Waterloo campaign in a letter to his uncle.

Robert Torrens served under the Duke of Wellington in the Second Anglo-Maratha War, the Peninsular War and the Waterloo campaign. In later life he served in the Queen's Foot in Madras and was Adjutant-General in the East Indies. He died at the age of 59.

Footnotes

References 

1780 births
1840 deaths
Companions of the Order of the Bath
19th Light Dragoons officers
West India Regiment officers
65th Regiment of Foot officers
British Army personnel of the Napoleonic Wars
British Army personnel of the Peninsular War
Recipients of the Order of St. Anna, 2nd class